Sandeep Shirodkar is an Indian film score composer, music director and record producer. He has also worked as an arranger of songs for other composers.

He has composed background scores for notable films like Dabangg, Bodyguard, Once Upon A Time in Mumbaai and Prince.

He has recently debuted as an original song composer. Sandeep along with Anu Malik composed the Chalti Hai Kya 9 Se 12 remake, Unchi Hai Building 2.0 remake for Judwaa 2.

Early life and career
Sandeep's father Hemant Shirodkar, was a sessions musician who played guitar for the famous yesteryear composer duo, Kalyanji–Anandji. As a child, Sandeep used to frequently accompany his father at session recordings.

He learnt to play the synthesizer from his father at the age of seven. Sandeep's professional career as a musician started when he played at his first recording session at the age of 12. He soon realized that this was what he was going to do in life; make music.

Sandeep also apprenticed under composer Viju Shah (son of Shri Kalyanji), whom he regards as his ‘Guru’.

Partial filmography as Background Score Composer
Below listed films are in Hindi language.

Original Songs

Awards
Global Indian Music Award (GIMA) 2011 and Zee Cine Award 2011 and Mirchi Music Award 2011 for Best Background Score – Dabangg
BIG Star IMA 2011 Award for Best Background Score – Once Upon A Time in Mumbaai

References

Indian film score composers
Year of birth missing (living people)
Living people